The peanut (Arachis hypogaea), also known as the groundnut, goober (US), pindar (US) or monkey nut (UK), is a legume crop grown mainly for its edible seeds. It is widely grown in the tropics and subtropics, important to both small and large commercial producers. It is classified as both a grain legume and, due to its high oil content, an oil crop. World annual production of shelled peanuts was 44 million tonnes in 2016, led by China with 38% of the world total. Atypically among legume crop plants, peanut pods develop underground (geocarpy) rather than above ground. With this characteristic in mind, the botanist Carl Linnaeus gave peanuts the specific epithet hypogaea, which means "under the earth".

The peanut belongs to the botanical family Fabaceae (or Leguminosae), commonly known as the legume, bean, or pea family. Like most other legumes, peanuts harbor symbiotic nitrogen-fixing bacteria in root nodules. The capacity to fix nitrogen means peanuts require less nitrogen-containing fertilizer and improve soil fertility, making them valuable in crop rotations.

Peanuts are similar in taste and nutritional profile to tree nuts such as walnuts and almonds, and, as a culinary nut, are often served in similar ways in Western cuisines. The botanical definition of a nut is "a fruit whose ovary wall becomes hard at maturity." Using this criterion, the peanut is not a nut. However, peanuts are usually categorized as nuts for culinary purposes and in common English more generally.

History
The Arachis genus is native to South America, east of the Andes, around Peru, Bolivia, Argentina, and Brazil. Cultivated peanuts (A. hypogaea) arose from a hybrid between two wild species of peanut, thought to be A. duranensis and A. ipaensis. The initial hybrid would have been sterile, but spontaneous chromosome doubling restored its fertility, forming what is termed an amphidiploid or allotetraploid. Genetic analysis suggests the hybridization may have occurred only once and gave rise to A. monticola, a wild form of peanut that occurs in a few limited locations in northwestern Argentina, or in southeastern Bolivia, where the peanut landraces with the most wild-like features are grown today. and by artificial selection to A. hypogaea.

The process of domestication through artificial selection made A. hypogaea dramatically different from its wild relatives. The domesticated plants are bushier, more compact, and have a different pod structure and larger seeds. From this primary center of origin, cultivation spread and formed secondary and tertiary centers of diversity in Peru, Ecuador, Brazil, Paraguay, and Uruguay. Over time, thousands of peanut landraces evolved; these are classified into six botanical varieties and two subspecies (as listed in the peanut scientific classification table). Subspecies A. h. fastigiata types are more upright in their growth habit and have shorter crop cycles. Subspecies A. h. hypogaea types spread more on the ground and have longer crop cycles.

The oldest known archeological remains of pods have been dated at about 7,600 years old, possibly a wild species that was in cultivation, or A. hypogaea in the early phase of domestication. They were found in Peru, where dry climatic conditions are favorable for the preservation of organic material. Almost certainly, peanut cultivation antedated this at the center of origin where the climate is moister. Many pre-Columbian cultures, such as the Moche, depicted peanuts in their art. Cultivation was well-established in Mesoamerica before the Spanish arrived. European traders later spread the peanut worldwide, and cultivation is now widespread in tropical and subtropical regions. In West Africa, it substantially replaced a crop plant from the same family, the Bambara groundnut, whose seed pods also develop underground. In Asia, it became an agricultural mainstay, and this region is now the largest producer in the world.

In the English-speaking world, peanut growing is most important in the United States. It was mainly a garden crop for much of the colonial period before shifting to mostly animal feedstock until human consumption grew in the 1930s. The United States Department of Agriculture initiated a program to encourage agricultural production and human consumption of peanuts in the late 19th and early 20th centuries.

Peanut butter was developed in the 1880s and 1890s in the United States and Canada.

Botany

As a legume, it belongs to the botanical family Fabaceae, also known as Leguminosae, and commonly known as the legume, bean, or pea family. Like most other legumes, peanuts harbor symbiotic nitrogen-fixing bacteria in their root nodules.

Like those of many other legumes, the leaves are nyctinastic; that is, they have "sleep" movements, closing at night.

They are borne in axillary clusters on the stems above ground and last for just one day. The ovary is located at the base of what appears to be the flower stem but is a highly elongated floral cup.

Peanut fruits develop underground, an unusual feature known as geocarpy. After fertilization, a short stalk at the base of the ovary—often termed a gynophore, but which appears to be part of the ovary—elongates to form a thread-like structure known as a "peg". This peg grows into the soil, allowing the fruit to develop underground. The shell of the peanut fruit consists primarily of a mesocarp with several large veins traversing its length.

Parts

Parts of the peanut include:
 Shell – outer covering, in contact with soil
 Cotyledons (two) – the main edible part
 Seed coat – brown paper-like covering of the edible part
 Radicle – embryonic root at the bottom of the cotyledon, which can be snapped off
 Plumule – embryonic shoot emerging from the top of the radicle

Cultivation

Peanuts grow best in light, sandy loam soil with a pH of 5.9–7. Their capacity to fix nitrogen means that providing they nodulate properly, peanuts benefit little or not at all from nitrogen-containing fertilizer, and they improve soil fertility. Therefore, they are valuable in crop rotations. Also, the yield of the peanut crop itself is increased in rotations through reduced diseases, pests, and weeds. For example, in Texas, peanuts in a three-year rotation with corn yield 50% more than nonrotated peanuts. Adequate levels of phosphorus, potassium, calcium, magnesium, and micronutrients are also necessary for good yields. Peanuts need warm weather throughout the growing season to develop well. Depending on growing conditions and the cultivar of peanut, harvest is usually 90 to 130 days after planting for subspecies A. h. fastigiata types, and 120 to 150 days after planting for subspecies A. h. hypogaea types. Subspecies A. h. hypogaea types yield more and are usually preferred where the growing seasons are sufficiently long.

Peanut plants continue to produce flowers when pods are developing; therefore, some pods are immature even when they are ready for harvest. To maximize yield, the timing of harvest is important. If it is too early, too many pods will be unripe; if too late, the pods will snap off at the stalk and remain in the soil. For harvesting, the entire plant, including most of the roots, is removed from the soil. The pods are covered with a network of raised veins and are constricted between seeds.

The main yield-limiting factors in semiarid regions are drought and high-temperature stress. The stages of reproductive development before flowering, at flowering, and at early pod development are particularly sensitive to these constraints. Apart from nitrogen, phosphorus and potassium, other nutrient deficiencies causing significant yield losses are calcium, iron and boron. Biotic stresses mainly include pests, diseases, and weeds. Among insects pests, pod borers, aphids, and mites are of importance. The most important diseases are leaf spots, rusts, and the toxin-producing fungus Aspergillus.

Harvesting occurs in two stages. In mechanized systems, a machine is used to cut off the main root of the peanut plant by cutting through the soil just below the level of the peanut pods. The machine lifts the "bush" from the ground, shakes it, then inverts it, leaving the plant upside down to keep the peanuts out of the soil. This allows the peanuts to dry slowly to a little less than a third of their original moisture level over three to four days. Traditionally, peanuts were pulled and inverted by hand.

After the peanuts have dried sufficiently, they are threshed, removing the peanut pods from the rest of the bush. peanuts must be dried properly and stored in dry conditions. If they are too high in moisture, or if storage conditions are poor, they may become infected by the mold fungus Aspergillus flavus. Many strains of this fungus release toxic and highly carcinogenic substances called aflatoxins.

Cultivars in the United States
There are many peanut cultivars grown around the world. The market classes grown in the United States are Spanish, Runner, Virginia, and Valencia. Peanut production in the United States is divided into three major areas: the southeastern United States region which includes Alabama, Georgia, and Florida; the southwestern United States region which includes New Mexico, Oklahoma, and Texas; and the third region in the general eastern United States which includes Virginia, North Carolina, and South Carolina. In Georgia, Naomi Chapman Woodroof is responsible for developing the breeding program of peanuts resulting in a harvest almost five times greater.

Certain cultivar groups are preferred for particular characteristics, such as differences in flavor, oil content, size, shape, and disease resistance. Most peanuts marketed in the shell are of the Virginia type, along with some Valencias selected for large size and the attractive appearance of the shell. Spanish peanuts are used mostly for peanut candy, salted nuts, and peanut butter.

Spanish group
The small Spanish types are grown in South Africa and the southwestern and southeastern United States. Until 1940, 90% of the peanuts grown in the US state of Georgia were Spanish types, but the trend since then has been larger-seeded, higher-yielding, more disease-resistant cultivars. Spanish peanuts have a higher oil content than other types of peanuts. In the United States, the Spanish group is primarily grown in New Mexico, Oklahoma, and Texas.

Cultivars of the Spanish group include 'Dixie Spanish', 'Improved Spanish 2B', 'GFA Spanish', 'Argentine', 'Spantex', 'Spanette', 'Shaffers Spanish', 'Natal Common (Spanish)', "White Kernel Varieties', 'Starr', 'Comet', 'Florispan', 'Spanhoma', 'Spancross', 'OLin', 'Tamspan 90', 'AT 9899–14', 'Spanco', 'Wilco I', 'GG 2', 'GG 4', 'TMV 2', and 'Tamnut 06'.

Runner group
Since 1940, the southeastern US region has seen a shift to producing Runner group peanuts. This shift is due to good flavor, better roasting characteristics, and higher yields when compared to Spanish types, leading to food manufacturers' preference for the use in peanut butter and salted nuts. Georgia's production is now almost 100% Runner-type.

Cultivars of Runners include 'Southeastern Runner 56-15', 'Dixie Runner', 'Early Runner', 'Virginia Bunch 67', 'Bradford Runner', 'Egyptian Giant' (also known as 'Virginia Bunch' and 'Giant'), 'Rhodesian Spanish Bunch' (Valencia and Virginia Bunch), 'North Carolina Runner 56-15', 'Florunner', 'Virugard', 'Georgia Green', 'Tamrun 96', 'Flavor Runner 458', 'Tamrun OL01', 'Tamrun OL02' 'AT-120', 'Andru-93', 'Southern Runner', 'AT1-1', 'Georgia Brown', 'GK-7', and 'AT-108'.

Virginia group
The large-seeded Virginia group peanuts are grown in the US states of Virginia, North Carolina, Tennessee, Texas, New Mexico, Oklahoma, and parts of Georgia. They are increasing in popularity due to the demand for large peanuts for processing, particularly for salting, confections, and roasting in shells.

Virginia group peanuts are either bunch or running in growth habit. The bunch type is upright to spreading. The pods are borne within  of the base of the plant.

Cultivars of Virginia-type peanuts include 'NC 7', 'NC 9', 'NC 10C', 'NC-V 11', 'VA 93B', 'NC 12C', 'VA-C 92R', 'Gregory', 'VA 98R', 'Perry', 'Wilson, 'Hull', 'AT VC-2' and 'Shulamit'.

Valencia group

Valencia group peanuts are coarse and have heavy reddish stems and large foliage. In the United States, large commercial production is primarily in the South Plains of West Texas and in eastern New Mexico near and south of Portales, but they are grown on a small scale elsewhere in the South as the best-flavored and preferred type for boiled peanuts. Peanut pods are borne on pegs arising from the main stem and the side branches. Most pods are clustered around the base of the plant, and only a few are found several inches away. Valencia types are three- to five-seeded and smooth, with no constriction of the shell between the seeds. Seeds are oval and tightly crowded into the pods. Typical seed weight is 0.4 to 0.5 g. This type is used heavily for selling roasted and salted in-shell peanuts and peanut butter. Varieties include 'Valencia A' and 'Valencia C'.

Tennessee Red and Tennessee White groups
These are alike except for the color of the seed. Sometimes known also as Texas Red or White, the plants are similar to Valencia types, except the stems are green to greenish brown, and the pods are rough, irregular, and have a smaller proportion of kernels.

Production

In 2020, world production of peanuts (reported as groundnuts in shells) was 54 million tonnes, an 8% increase over 2019 production. China had 34% of global production, followed by India (19%) (table). Other significant producers were Nigeria, the United States, and Sudan.

Food

Whole peanuts

Dry-roasting peanuts is a common form of preparation.

Boiled peanuts are a popular snack in India, China, West Africa, and the southern United States. In the US South, boiled peanuts are often prepared in briny water and sold in streetside stands.

A distinction can be drawn between raw and green peanuts. A green peanut is a term to describe farm-fresh harvested peanuts that have not been dehydrated. They are available from grocery stores, food distributors, and farmers markets during the growing season. Raw peanuts are also uncooked but have been dried/dehydrated and must be rehydrated before boiling (usually in a bowl full of water overnight). Once rehydrated, the raw peanuts are ready to be boiled.

Peanut oil

Peanut oil is often used in cooking because it has a mild flavor and a relatively high smoke point. Due to its high monounsaturated content, it is considered more healthful than saturated oils and is resistant to rancidity. The several types of peanut oil include aromatic roasted peanut oil, refined peanut oil, extra virgin or cold-pressed peanut oil, and peanut extract. Refined peanut oil is exempt from allergen labeling laws in the United States.

Peanut butter

Peanut butter is a food paste or spread made from ground dry roasted peanuts. It often contains additional ingredients that modify the taste or texture, such as salt, sweeteners, or emulsifiers. Many companies have added twists on traditionally plain peanut butter by adding various flavor varieties, such as chocolate, birthday cake, and cinnamon raisin. Peanut butter is served as a spread on bread, toast or crackers, and used to make sandwiches (notably the peanut butter and jelly sandwich). It is also used in a number of confections, such as peanut-flavored granola bars or croissants and other pastries. The United States is a leading exporter of peanut butter, and itself consumes $800 million of peanut butter annually.

Peanut flour

Peanut flour is used in gluten-free cooking.

Peanut proteins
Peanut protein concentrates and isolates are commercially produced from defatted peanut flour using several methods. Peanut flour concentrates (about 70% protein) are produced from dehulled kernels by removing most of the oil and the water-soluble, non-protein components. Hydraulic pressing, screw pressing, solvent extraction, and pre-pressing followed by solvent extraction may be used for oil removal, after which protein isolation and purification are implemented.

Cuisine

Latin America
Peanuts are particularly common in Peruvian and Mexican cuisine, both of which marry indigenous and European ingredients.  For instance, in Peru, a popular traditional dish is picante de cuy, a roasted guinea pig served in a sauce of ground peanuts (ingredients native to South America) with roasted onions and garlic (ingredients from European cuisine). Also, in the Peruvian city of Arequipa, a dish called ocopa consists of a smooth sauce of roasted peanuts and hot peppers (both native to the region) with roasted onions, garlic, and oil, poured over meat or potatoes. Another example is a fricassee combining a similar mixture with sautéed seafood or boiled and shredded chicken. These dishes are generally known as ajíes, meaning "hot peppers", such as ají de pollo and ají de mariscos (seafood ajíes may omit peanuts). In Mexico, it is also used to prepare different traditional dishes, such as chicken in peanut sauce (encacahuatado), and is used as the main ingredient for the preparation of other famous dishes such as red pipián, mole poblano and oaxacan mole negro.

Likewise, during colonial times in Peru, the Spanish used peanuts to replace nuts unavailable locally but used extensively in Spanish cuisine, such as almonds and pine nuts, typically ground or as a paste mixed with rice, meats, and vegetables for dishes like rice pilaf.

Throughout the region, many candies and snacks are made using peanuts. In Mexico, it is common to find them in different presentations as a snack or candy: salty, "Japanese" peanuts, praline, enchilados or in the form of a traditional sweet made with peanuts and honey called palanqueta, and even as peanut marzipan.

West Asia

Crunchy coated peanuts, called kabukim in Hebrew, are a popular snack in Israel. Kabukim are commonly sold by weight at corner stores where fresh nuts and seeds are sold, though they are also available packaged. The coating typically consists of flour, salt, starch, lecithin, and sometimes sesame seeds.  The origin of the name is obscure (it may be derived from kabuk, which means nutshell or husk in Turkish).  An additional variety of crunchy coated peanuts popular in Israel is "American peanuts". The coating of this variety is thinner but harder to crack.

Bamba puffs are a popular snack in Israel. Their shape is similar to Cheez Doodles, but they are made of peanuts and corn.

Southeast Asia

Peanuts are also widely used in Southeast Asian cuisine, such as in Malaysia, Vietnam, and Indonesia, where they are typically made into a spicy sauce. Peanuts came to Indonesia from the Philippines, where the legume was derived from Mexico during Spanish colonization. One Philippine dish using peanuts is kare-kare, a mixture of meat and peanut butter. Apart from being used in dishes, fried shelled peanuts are a common inexpensive snack in the Philippines. The peanuts are commonly served plain salted with garlic chips and variants, including adobo and chili flavors.

Common Indonesian peanut-based dishes include gado-gado, pecel, karedok, and ketoprak,  vegetable salads mixed with peanut sauce, and the peanut-based sauce, satay.

Indian subcontinent
In the Indian subcontinent, peanuts are a light snack, usually roasted and salted (sometimes with the addition of chilli powder), and often sold roasted in pods or boiled with salt. They are also made into dessert or sweet snack of peanut brittle by processing with refined sugar and jaggery. Indian cuisine uses roasted, crushed peanuts to give a crunchy body to salads; they are added whole (without pods) to leafy vegetable stews for the same reason. Another use is peanut oil for cooking. Most Indians use mustard, sunflower, and peanut oil for cooking. In South India, groundnut chutney is eaten with dosa and idli as breakfast. Peanuts are also used in sweets and savory items in South India and also as a flavor in tamarind rice. Kovilpatti is known for its sweet peanut chikki or peanut brittle, which is also used in savory and sweet mixtures, such as Bombay mix.

West Africa
Peanuts grow well in southern Mali and adjacent regions of the Ivory Coast, Burkina Faso, Ghana, Nigeria, and Senegal; peanuts are similar in both agricultural and culinary qualities to the Bambara groundnut native to the region, and West Africans have adopted the crop as a staple. Peanut sauce, prepared with onions, garlic, peanut butter/paste, and vegetables such as carrots, cabbage, and cauliflower, can be vegetarian (the peanuts supplying ample protein) or prepared with meat, usually chicken.

Peanuts are used in the Malian meat stew maafe. In Ghana, peanut butter is used for peanut butter soup nkate nkwan. Crushed peanuts may also be used for peanut candies nkate cake and kuli-kuli, as well as other local foods such as oto. Peanut butter is an ingredient in Nigeria's "African salad". Peanut powder is an important ingredient in the spicy coating for kebabs (Suya) in Nigeria and Ghana.

East Africa
Peanuts are a common ingredient of several types of relishes (dishes which accompany nshima) eaten in Malawi, and in the eastern part of Zambia, and these dishes are common throughout both countries. Thick peanut butter sauces are also made in Uganda to serve with rice and other starchy foods. Groundnut stew, called ebinyebwa in Luganda-speaking areas of Uganda, is made by boiling ground peanut flour with other ingredients, such as cabbage, mushrooms, dried fish, meat or other vegetables. Across East Africa, roasted peanuts, often in cones of newspaper, are obtained from street vendors.

North America
In Canada and the United States, peanuts are used in candies, cakes, cookies, and other sweets. Individually, they are eaten dry-roasted with or without salt. In the United States, peanuts and peanut butter are central to American dietary practices, and are typically considered as comfort foods. Peanuts were sold at fairs or by pushcart operators through the 19th century. Peanut butter is a common peanut-based food, representing half of the American total peanut consumption and $850 million in annual retail sales. Peanut soup is found on restaurant menus in the southeastern states. In some southern portions of the US, peanuts are boiled for several hours until soft and moist. Peanuts are also deep-fried, sometimes within the shell. Per person, Americans eat  of peanut products annually, spending a total of $2 billion in peanut retail purchases.

Malnutrition
Peanuts are used to help fight malnutrition. Plumpy Nut, MANA Nutrition, and Medika Mamba are high-protein, high-energy, and high-nutrient peanut-based pastes developed to be used as a therapeutic food to aid in famine relief. The World Health Organization, UNICEF, Project Peanut Butter, and Doctors Without Borders have used these products to help save malnourished children in developing countries.

Peanuts can be used like other legumes and grains to make a lactose-free, milk-like beverage, peanut milk, which is promoted in Africa as a way to reduce malnutrition among children.

Animal feed
Peanut plant tops and crop residues can be used for hay.

The protein cake (oilcake meal) residue from oil processing is used as animal feed and soil fertilizer. Groundnut cake is a livestock feed, mostly used by cattle as protein supplements. It is one of the most important and valuable feeds for all types of livestock and one of the most active ingredients for poultry rations.  Poor storage of the cake may sometimes result in its contamination by aflatoxin, a naturally occurring mycotoxin that is produced by Aspergillus flavus and Aspergillus parasiticus. The major constituents of the cake are essential amino acids such as lysine and glutamine. Other components are crude fiber, crude protein, and fat.

Some peanuts can also be fed whole to livestock, for example, those over the peanut quota in the US or those with a higher aflatoxin content than that permitted by the food regulations.

Peanut processing often requires dehulling: the hulls generated in large amounts by the peanut industries can feed livestock, particularly ruminants.

Industrial use

Peanuts have a variety of industrial end uses. Paint, varnish, lubricating oil, leather dressings, furniture polish, insecticides, and nitroglycerin are made from peanut oil. Soap is made from saponified oil, and many cosmetics contain peanut oil and its derivatives. The protein portion is used in the manufacture of some textile fibers. Peanut shells are used in the manufacture of plastic, wallboard, abrasives, fuel, cellulose (used in rayon and paper), and mucilage (glue).

Nutritional value

Peanuts are rich in essential nutrients (right table, USDA nutrient data). In a  reference serving, peanuts provide  of food energy and are an excellent source (defined as more than 20% of the Daily Value, DV) of several B vitamins, vitamin E, several dietary minerals, such as manganese (95% DV), magnesium (52% DV) and phosphorus (48% DV), and dietary fiber (right table). They also contain about 25 g of protein per 100 g serving, a higher proportion than in many tree nuts.

Some studies show that regular consumption of peanuts is associated with a lower specific risk of mortality from certain diseases. However, the study designs do not allow cause and effect to be inferred. According to the US Food and Drug Administration, "Scientific evidence suggests but does not prove that eating 1.5 ounces per day of most nuts (such as peanuts) as part of a diet low in saturated fat and cholesterol may reduce the risk of heart disease."

Ranked second after soya beans, peanuts are the world's largest source of vegetable oil. They are the main constituent of margarine and are produced commercially as salad and cooking oil.

Phytochemicals
Peanuts contain polyphenols, polyunsaturated and monounsaturated fats, phytosterols and dietary fiber in amounts similar to several tree nuts.

Peanut skins contain resveratrol, which is under preliminary research for its potential effects on humans.

Oil composition
A common cooking and salad oil, peanut oil is 46% monounsaturated fats (primarily oleic acid), 32% polyunsaturated fats (primarily linoleic acid), and 17% saturated fats (primarily palmitic acid). Extractable from whole peanuts using a simple water and centrifugation method, the oil is being considered by NASA's Advanced Life Support program for future long-duration human space missions.

Health concerns

Allergies

Some people (0.6% of the United States population) report that they experience allergic reactions to peanut exposure; symptoms are specifically severe for this nut and can range from watery eyes to anaphylactic shock, which is generally fatal if untreated. Eating a small amount of peanuts can cause a reaction. Because of their widespread use in prepared and packaged foods, avoiding peanuts can be difficult. Reading ingredients and warnings on product packaging is necessary to avoid this allergen. Foods processed in facilities that also handle peanuts on the same equipment as other foods are required to carry such warnings on their labels. Avoiding cross-contamination with peanuts and peanut products (along with other severe allergens like shellfish) is a promoted and common practice of which chefs and restaurants worldwide are becoming aware.

The hygiene hypothesis of allergy states that a lack of early childhood exposure to infectious agents like germs and parasites could be causing the increase in food allergies.

Studies comparing age of peanut introduction in Great Britain with introduction in Israel showed that delaying exposure to peanuts in childhood can dramatically increase the risk of developing peanut allergies.

Peanut allergy has been associated with the use of skin preparations containing peanut oil among children, but the evidence is not regarded as conclusive. Peanut allergies have also been associated with family history and intake of soy products.

Some school districts in the United States and elsewhere have banned peanuts or products containing peanuts. However, the efficacy of the bans in reducing allergic reactions is uncertain. A 2015 study in Canada found no difference in the percentage of accidental exposures occurring in schools prohibiting peanuts compared to schools allowing them.

Refined peanut oil will not cause allergic reactions in most people with peanut allergies. However, crude (unrefined) peanut oils have been shown to contain protein, which may cause allergic reactions. In a randomized, double-blind crossover study, 60 people with proven peanut allergy were challenged with both crude peanut oil and refined peanut oil. The authors concluded, "Crude peanut oil caused allergic reactions in 10% of allergic subjects studied and should continue to be avoided." They also stated, "Refined peanut oil does not seem to pose a risk to most people with peanut allergy." However, they point out that refined peanut oil can still pose a risk to peanut-allergic individuals if the oil that has previously been used for cooking foods containing peanuts is reused.

Contamination with aflatoxin
If peanut plants are subjected to severe drought during pod formation, or if pods are not properly stored, they may become contaminated with the mold Aspergillus flavus which may produce carcinogenic substances called aflatoxins. Lower-quality peanuts, particularly where mold is evident, are more likely to be contaminated. The United States Department of Agriculture tests every truckload of raw peanuts for aflatoxin; any containing aflatoxin levels of more than 15 parts per billion are destroyed. The peanut industry has manufacturing steps to ensure all peanuts are inspected for aflatoxin. Peanuts tested to have high aflatoxin are used to make peanut oil where the mold can be removed.

Gallery

See also

 African Groundnut Council
 BBCH-scale (peanut)
 Beer Nuts
 Columbian exchange
 Cracker nuts
 Ground nut soup
 List of peanut dishes
 List of edible seeds
 Peanut pie
 Power snack
 Tanganyika groundnut scheme, a failure started in 1951
 Universal Nut Sheller

References

External links

 
Arachis
Convenience foods
Crops originating from indigenous Americans
Crops originating from South America
Crops
Edible legumes
Edible nuts and seeds
Nitrogen-fixing crops
Oil seeds
Plants described in 1753
Snack foods
Taxa named by Carl Linnaeus